Bihar is a state in eastern India. Bihar borders Uttar Pradesh to its west, Nepal to the north, the northern part of West Bengal to the east, and with Jharkhand to the south. The Bihar plain is split by the river Ganges, which flows from west to east.

On 15 November 2000, southern Bihar was ceded to form the new state of Jharkhand. Only 20% of the population of Bihar lives in urban areas as of 2021. Additionally, almost 58% of Biharis are below the age of 25, giving Bihar the highest proportion of young people of any Indian state. The official language is Hindi and additional language is Urdu, although other languages are common, including Maithili, Magahi,  Bhojpuri, and other Languages of Bihar.

In Ancient and Classical India, the area that is now Bihar was considered the centre of political and cultural power and as a haven of learning. From Magadha arose India's first empire, the Maurya empire, as well as one of the world's most widely adhered-to religions: Buddhism. Magadha empires, notably under the Maurya and Gupta dynasties, unified large parts of South Asia under a central rule. Another region of Bihar, Mithila, was an early centre of learning and the centre of the Videha kingdom.

However, since the late 1970s, Bihar has lagged far behind other Indian states in terms of social and economic development. Many economists and social scientists claim that this is a direct result of the policies of the central government, such as the freight equalisation policy, its apathy towards Bihar, lack of Bihari sub-nationalism, and the Permanent Settlement of 1793 by the British East India Company. The state government has, however, made significant strides in developing the state. Improved governance has led to an economic revival in the state through increased investment in infrastructure, better healthcare facilities, greater emphasis on education, and a reduction in crime and corruption.

Etymology 
The name Bihar derives from the Sanskrit and Pali word vihāra (Devanagari: विहार), meaning "abode". The region roughly encompassing the present state had many Buddhist vihāras, the abodes of Buddhist monks in the ancient and medieval periods. Medieval writer Minhaj al-Siraj Juzjani records in the Tabaqat-i Nasiri that in 1198 Bakhtiyar Khalji committed a massacre in a town identified with the word, later known as Bihar Sharif, about 70 km (43 mi) away from Bodh Gaya.

History

Ancient period 
Chirand, on the northern bank of the Ganga River, in Saran district, has an archaeological record from the Neolithic age . Regions of Bihar – such as Magadha, Mithila, and Anga – are mentioned in religious texts and epics of ancient India.

Mithila gained prominence after the establishment of the Videha Kingdom.  During the late Vedic period  Videha became one of the major political and cultural centers of South Asia, along with Kuru and Pañcāla. The kings of the Videha Kingdom were called Janakas. Sita, a daughter of one of the Janaks of Mithila is mentioned as the consort of Lord Rama, in the Hindu epic Ramayana, written by Valmiki. The Videha Kingdom later became incorporated into the Vajjika League which had its capital in the city of Vaishali, which is also in Mithila. Vajji had a republican form of government where the head of state was elected from the rajas. Based on the information found in texts pertaining to Jainism and Buddhism, Vajji was established as a republic by the sixth century BCE, before the birth of Gautama Buddha in 563 BCE, making it the first known republic in India.

The Haryanka dynasty, founded in 684 BCE, ruled Magadha from the city of Rajgriha (modern Rajgir). The two well-known kings from this dynasty were Bimbisara and his son Ajatashatru, who imprisoned his father to ascend the throne. Ajatashatru founded the city of Pataliputra which later became the capital of Magadha. He declared war and conquered the Vajjika League. The Haryanka dynasty was followed by the Shishunaga dynasty. Later, the Nanda Dynasty ruled a vast tract stretching from Bengal to Punjab.

The Nanda dynasty was replaced by the Maurya Empire, India's first empire. The Maurya Empire and the religion of Buddhism arose in the region that now makes up modern Bihar. The Mauryan Empire, which originated from Magadha in 325 BCE, was founded by Chandragupta Maurya, who was born in Magadha. It had its capital at Pataliputra (modern Patna). Mauryan Emperor Ashoka, who was born in Pataliputra (Patna), is often considered to be among the most accomplished rulers in world history.

The Gupta Empire, which originated in Magadha in 240 CE, is referred to as the Golden Age of India in science, mathematics, astronomy, commerce, religion, and Indian philosophy. Bihar and Bengal were invaded by Rajendra Chola I of the Chola dynasty in the 11th century.

Medieval period 
Buddhism in Magadha went into decline due to the invasion of Muhammad bin Bakhtiyar Khalji, during which many of the viharas were destroyed along with the universities of Nalanda and Vikramashila. Some historians believe that thousands of Buddhist monks were massacred during the 12th century. D. N. Jha suggests, instead, that these incidents were the result of Buddhist–Brahmin skirmishes in a fight for supremacy. After the fall of the Pala Empire, the Chero dynasty ruled some parts of Bihar from the 12th century until Mughal rule in the 16th century. In 1540, the great Pathan chieftain, Sher Shah Suri, took northern India from the Mughals and declared Delhi his capital.

From the 11th century to the 20th century, Mithila was ruled by various indigenous dynasties. The first of these were the Karnatas, followed by the Oiniwar dynasty and Raj Darbhanga.
It was during this period that the capital of Mithila was shifted to Darbhanga.

The tenth and the last guru of Sikhism, Guru Gobind Singh, was born in Patna in 1666. With political instability in the Mughal Empire following Aurangzeb's death in 1707, Murshid Quli Khan declared Bengal's independence and named himself Nawab of Bengal.

Colonial era 
After the Battle of Buxar (1764), the British East India Company obtained the diwani rights (rights to administer and collect tax revenue) for Bihar, Bengal, and Odisha. The rich resources of fertile land, water, and skilled labour had attracted the foreign imperialists, particularly the Dutch and British, in the 18th century. A number of agriculture-based industries had been started in Bihar by foreign entrepreneurs. Bihar remained a part of the Bengal Presidency of British India until 1912, when Bihar and Orissa were carved out as separate provinces.

Pre- and post-Independence 

Farmers in Champaran had revolted against indigo cultivation in 1914 (at Pipra) and 1916 (Turkaulia). In April 1917, Mahatma Gandhi visited Champaran, where Raj Kumar Shukla had drawn his attention to the exploitation of the peasants by European indigo planters. The Champaran Satyagraha that followed received support from many Bihari nationalists, such as Rajendra Prasad Krishna Sinha and Anugrah Narayan Sinha.

In the northern and central regions of Bihar, the Kisan Sabha (peasant movement) was an important consequence of the independence movement. It began in 1929 under the leadership of Swami Sahajanand Saraswati who formed the Bihar Provincial Kisan Sabha (BPKS), to mobilise peasant grievances against the zamindari attacks on their occupancy rights. The movement intensified and spread from Bihar across the rest of India, culminating in the formation of the All India Kisan Sabha (AIKS) at the Lucknow session of the Indian National Congress in April 1936, where Saraswati was elected as its first president.

Following independence, Bihari migrant workers have faced violence and prejudice in many parts of India, such as Maharashtra, Punjab, and Assam.

Geography 

It is land locked by Nepal in the north, Jharkhand in the south  West Bengal in the east and Uttar Pradesh to the west. It has three parts on the basis of physical and structural conditions: the Southern Plateau, the Shivalik Region, and Bihar's Gangetic Plain. Furthermore, the vast stretch of fertile Bihar Plain is divided by the Ganges River into two unequal parts – North Bihar  and South Bihar. The Ganges flows west–east and, along with its tributaries, regularly floods parts of the Bihar plain. The main northern tributaries are the Gandak and Koshi, which originate in the Nepalese Himalayas, and the Bagmati, which originates in the Kathmandu Valley. Other tributaries are the Son, Budhi Gandak, Chandan, Orhani and Phalgu. Bihar has some small hills, such as the Rajgir hills in center, Kaimur Range in south-west and Shivalik Range in North. Bihar has notified forest area of 6,764.14 km2, which is 7.1 percent of its geographical area. The sub-Himalayan foothills of Shivalik ranges, primary Someshwar and Dun mountain, in West Champaran district are clad in a belt of moist deciduous forest. As well as trees, this consists of scrub, grass and reeds.

Bihar lies completely in the Subtropical region of the Temperate Zone, and its climatic type is humid subtropical. Its temperature is subtropical in general, with hot summers and cold winters. Bihar has an average daily high temperature of only 26 °C with a yearly average of 26 °C. The climate is very warm, but has only a very few tropical and humid months. Several months of the year it is warm to hot at temperatures continuously above 25 °C, sometimes up to 29 °C. Due to less rain the best time for traveling is from October to April. The most rainy days occur from May to September.

Flora and fauna

The sub-Himalayan foothill of Someshwar and the Dun ranges in the Champaran district have belts of moist deciduous forests, mixed with shrubs, grass and reeds. High rainfall (above 1,600 mm [63 in]) promotes forests of Sal (Shorea robusta) in these areas. Other important trees are Sal Cedrela Toona, Khair, and Semal. Deciduous forests also occur in the Saharsa and Purnia districts, with common trees including Shorea robusta, Diospyros melanoxylon, Boswellia serrata, Terminalia tomentose, Terminalia bellerica, Terminalia arjuna, Pterocarpus marsupium, and Madhuca indica.

It has a diverse landscape and biodiversity in addition to sheltering the protected carnivores. Vikramshila Gangetic Dolphin Sanctuary in Bhagalpur region is a reserve for the endangered South Asian river dolphin. Other species in Bihar include leopard, bear, hyena, bison, chital and barking deer. Crocodilians including gharials and muggers as well as Gangetic turtles can be found in the river systems. Karkatgarh Waterfall on Karmanasa River is a natural habitat of the crocodilians. In 2016, the government of Bihar has accepted the proposal of the forest authorities to turn the place into a Crocodile Conservation Reserve (CCR). Other notable wildlife sanctuaries include Kaimur Wildlife Sanctuary, Bhimbandh Wildlife Sanctuary and Gautam Buddha Wildlife Sanctuary. Many varieties of local and migratory bird species can be seen in natural wetlands of Kanwar Lake Bird Sanctuary, Baraila lake, Kusheshwar Nath Lake, Udaypur lake.

Natural resource
Bihar is the principal holder of the country's pyrite resources and possesses 95% of the resources.

In May 2022, a gold mine was found in the district of Jamui. It accounts for more than 44% of country's gold reserve, approximately 223 million tons.

Demographics 

At the 2011 Census, Bihar was the third most populous state of India with a total population of 104,099,452. It was also India's most densely populated state, with 1,106 persons per square kilometre.  The sex ratio was 1090 females per 1000 males in the year 2020. Almost 58% of Bihar's population was below 25 years age, which is the highest in India. In 2021, Bihar has had an urbanisation rate of 20%.  Bihar has an adult literacy rate of 68.15% (78.5% for males and 57.8% for females) in 2020.

According to the 2011 census, 82.7% of Bihar's population practised Hinduism, while 16.9% followed Islam. Christianity (0.12%), Buddhism (0.02%) and Sikhism (0.02%) is minority in religion in Bihar. Most of Bihar's population belongs to Indo-Aryan-speaking ethnic groups. It also attracted Punjabi Hindu refugees during the Partition of British India in 1947.

Hindi is the official language of the state and spoken by 25.54% of the total population. At 8.42%, Urdu is the second official language in 15 districts of the state. However, the majority of the people speak one of the Bihari languages, most of which as classified as dialects of Hindi during the census. The major ones are Bhojpuri (24.86%), Maithili (12.55%)and Magahi (10.87%) Maithili is a recognised regional language of India under the Eighth Schedule to the Constitution of India. Proponents have called Bhojpuri, Magahi, Angika and Bajjika to receive the same status. Smaller communities of Bengali and Surjapuri speakers are found in the parts of the state, especially in the eastern districts and urban areas.

Government and administration 

Governor is the constitutional head of the government of Bihar, who is appointed by the President of India. Chief minister is the executive head of the government who with its cabinet ministers makes all important decisions. The political party or coalition of political parties having a majority in the Bihar Legislative Assembly forms the government.

Chief secretary is the head of the bureaucracy of the state, under whom a hierarchy of officials is drawn from the Indian Administrative Service, Indian Police Service, Indian Forest Service, and different wings of the state civil services. The judiciary is headed by the Chief Justice of the High Court. Bihar has a high court in Patna, which has been functioning since 1916. All the branches of the government are located in the state capital, Patna.

The state is administratively divided into 9 divisions and 38 districts. For the administration of urban areas, Bihar has 19 municipal corporations, 89 nagar parishads (city councils), and 154 nagar panchayats (town councils).

Politics 

By 2004, The Economist magazine said that "Bihar [had] become a byword for the worst of India, of widespread and inescapable poverty, of corrupt politicians indistinguishable from mafia-dons they patronise, caste-ridden social order that has retained the worst feudal cruelties". In 2005, the World Bank believed that issues faced by the state were "enormous" because of "persistent poverty, complex social stratification, unsatisfactory infrastructure and weak governance".
 there are two main political formations: the National Democratic Alliance (NDA) which comprises Bharatiya Janata Party (BJP, Indian People's Party), Lok Janashakti Party (LJP) and Janata Dal (United) (JDU); and a second alliance between Rashtriya Janata Dal (RJD, National People's Party), Hindustani Awam Morcha, Rashtriya Lok Samta Party and Indian National Congress (INC). There are many other political formations. The Communist Party of India had a strong presence in Bihar at one time, which has since weakened. The Communist Party of India (Marxist) CPI(M) and CPM and All India Forward Bloc (AIFB) have a minor presence, along with the other extreme leftist parties.

Nitish Kumar has been chief minister of Bihar for 13 years between 2005 and 2020. In contrast to prior governments, which emphasised divisions of caste and religion, his political platform was based on economic development, reduction of crime and corruption, and greater social equality. Since 2010, the government confiscated the properties of corrupt officials and redeployed them as school buildings. They also introduced Bihar Special Court Act to curb crime. It also legislated a two-hour lunch break on Fridays, to enable Muslim employees to pray and thereby reduce absenteeism. The government has prohibited the sale and consumption of alcohol in the state since March 2016, which has been linked to a drop in tourism and a rise in substance abuse.

Public health 
Bihar generally ranks weakest in health outcomes in comparison to other Indian states. While the National Health Mission, the Clinical Establishments Act of 2010, and the formation of the Empowered Action Group (EAG) provide federal funds to expand and improve healthcare services, Bihar's ability to fully utilise this funding is lacking.

Research indicates that Bihar relies on privatised hospitals to provide healthcare to the masses, with the second-highest ratio among Indian states for private to public spending and high levels of corruption. These factors are associated with slower healthcare delivery and steep healthcare costs. Corruption is enabled as Bihar lacks continuity and transparency of health reporting as required by the Clinical Establishments Act of 2010. In turn, this prevents the government from making evidence-based conclusions about policy changes and hospital effectiveness, resulting in patterns of ill-informed spending and inconsistent hiring.

When comparing Bihar to Kerala, the number of healthcare professionals (including registered nurses, auxiliary nurses, physicians and health supervisors) at each hospital are significantly lower, and remain constant over time while they steadily increase in number in Kerala. According to Ministry of Health statistics, the greatest shortfalls are for physicians and specialists at 75%. Bihar has only 50% of the sub-health centres, 60% of the primary health centres, and 9% of the community health centres required by the national supply-to-population standards. The number of public hospital beds in Bihar decreased between 2008 and 2015. Given the high population density of the state, Bihar is significantly behind in the number of healthcare professionals that should be employed. Despite these shortcomings, Bihar has shown gradual signs of improvement for female health workers, death rate, and infant, neo-natal, child and maternal mortality rates.

Economy 

Bihar's gross state domestic product (GSDP) for the fiscal year (FY) 2013–14 was around  billion. By sectors, its composition is 22% agriculture, 5% industry and 73% services. Bihar has the fastest-growing state economy in terms of GSDP, with a growth rate of 17.06% in FY 2014–15. The economy of Bihar was projected to grow at a compound annual growth rate (CAGR) of 13.4% during 2012–2017 (the 12th Five-Year Plan). Bihar has experienced strong growth in per capita net state domestic product (NSDP). At current prices, per capita NSDP of the state grew at a CAGR of 12.91% from 2004 to 2005 to 2014–15. Bihar's per capita income went up by 40.6% in FY 2014–15. The state's debt was estimated at 77% of GDP by 2007.

Agriculture 
Among the states of India, Bihar is the fourth-largest producer of vegetables and the eighth-largest producer of fruits. About 80% of the state's population is employed in agriculture, which is above the national average. The main agricultural products are litchi, guava, mango, pineapple, brinjal, lady's finger, cauliflower, cabbage, rice, wheat, sugarcane, and sunflower. Though good soil and favourable climatic conditions favour agriculture, this can be hampered by floods and soil erosion. The southern parts of the state endure annual droughts, which affect crops such as paddy.

Industry 

Begusarai is the industrial and financial capital of Bihar. It has major industries like Barauni Refinery, NTPC, Barauni (BTPS), Barauni Fertiliser Plant (HURL, Barauni), Sudha Dairy Plant, Pepsi Bottling Plant.
 
Hajipur, Dalmianagar, Munger and Barauni are the major industrial cities in Bihar  The capital city, Patna, is one of the better-off cities in India when measured by per capita income.

The Finance Ministry has sought to create investment opportunities for big industrial houses like Reliance Industries. Further developments have taken place in the growth of small industries, improvements in IT infrastructure, a software park in Patna, Darbhanga, Bhagalpur, and the completion of the expressway from the Purvanchal border through Bihar to Jharkhand. In August 2008, a Patna-registered company called the Security and Intelligence Services took over the Australian guard and mobile patrol services business of American conglomerate, United Technologies Corporation (UTC). SIS is registered and taxed in Bihar.

Prior to prohibition, Bihar emerged as a brewery hub with numerous production units. In August 2018, United Breweries Limited announced it would begin production of non-alcoholic beer at its previously defunct brewery in Bihar.

Income distribution 
In terms of income, the districts of Patna, Munger, and Begusarai placed highest among the 38 districts in the state, recording the highest per capita gross district domestic product of 31,441, 10,087 and 9,312, respectively, in FY 2004–05.

Income disparity among social groups
Rumela Sen outlines the inequalities and backwardness prevalent in Bihar in post-independence period as a consequence of the "delaying tactics" in implementation of land reform and utilisation of kinship ties by the upper-caste landlords, who were having obstructionist attitude towards the land reform programs. The upper-caste not only dominated the administration, but also the politics in the post-independence period, and they utilised the caste ties to keep  about 9000 acres of land undisturbed to the poor. Since the landlords primarily belonged to upper-caste as were the politicians and administrators, they were successful in grabbing large holdings amidst the passage of Zamindari abolition act of 1952.

Culture

Paintings 

There are several traditional styles of painting practised in Bihar. One is Mithila painting, a style used in the Mithila region of Bihar. Traditionally, this form was practised mainly by women, passed down generation to generation. Painting was usually done on walls during festivals, religious events, births, marriages, and other cultural milestones. It was traditionally done on the plastered walls of mud huts, and is also done on cloth, handmade paper and canvas. Famous Mithila painters include Smt Bharti Dayal, Mahasundari Devi, the late Ganga Devi, and Sita Devi.

Mithila painting is also called Madhubani art. It mostly depicts human beings and their association with nature.  Common scenes illustrate deities and Saraswati from ancient epics, celestial objects, and religious plants like Tulsi, and scenes from the royal court and social events. Generally, no space is left empty.

The Patna School of Painting (Patna Kalam), sometimes called "Company Painting", flourished in Bihar during the early 18th to mid-20th centuries. It was an offshoot of the Mughal Miniature School of Painting. Those who practised this art form were descendants of Hindu artisans of Mughal painting. Facing persecution from the Mughal Emperor, Aurangzeb, these artisans found refuge, via Murshidabad, in Patna during the late 18th century. Their art shared the characteristics of the Mughal painters, expanded subject matter from court scenes to bazaar scenes, daily life and ceremonies. They used watercolours on paper and on mica. This school of painting formed the basis for the formation of the Patna Art School under the leadership of Shri Radha Mohan. The school is an important centre of the fine arts in Bihar.

Performing arts 

Bihar has produced musicians like Bharat Ratna, Ustad Bismillah Khan and dhrupad singers like the Malliks (Darbhanga Gharana) and the Mishras (Bettiah Gharana), along with poets like Vidyapati Thakur who contributed to Maithili music. The classical music in Bihar is a form of Hindustani classical music.

Gaya is another centre of classical music, particularly of the Tappa and Thumri varieties. Pandit Govardhan Mishra – son of the Ram Prasad Mishra, himself an accomplished singer – is perhaps the finest living exponent of Tappa singing in India, according to Padma Shri Gajendra Narayan Singh, founding secretary of the Sangeet Natak Academi of Bihar.

Gajendra Narayan Singh also writes, in his memoir, that Champanagar, Banaili, was another major centre of classical music. Rajkumar Shyamanand Sinha of Champanagar, Banaili princely state, was a great patron of music and was himself one of the finest exponents of classical vocal music in Bihar in his time. Singh, in another book on Indian classical music, wrote that "Kumar Shyamanand Singh of Banaili estate had such expertise in singing that many great singers including Kesarbai Kerkar acknowledged his ability. After listening to bandishes from Kumar Sahib, Pandit Jasraj was moved to tears and lamented that, alas, he did not have such ability himself." [free translation of Hindi text].

During the 19th century, many Biharis emigrated as indentured labourers to the West Indies, Fiji, and Mauritius. During this time many sad plays and songs called birha became popular in the Bhojpur region, as Bhojpuri Birha. Dramas incorporating this theme continue to be popular in the theatres of Patna.

Cinema 

Bihar has a robust Bhojpuri-language film industry. There is also a smaller production of Magadhi-, Maithili language films. The first film with Bhojpuri dialogue was Ganga Jamuna, released in 1961.
Bhaiyaa, the first Magadhi film, was released in 1961.
The first Maithili movie was Kanyadan released in 1965.
Maithili film Mithila Makhaan won the
National Film Award for Best Maithili Film in 2016.
The history of films entirely in Bhojpuri begins in 1962 with the well-received film Ganga Maiyya Tohe Piyari Chadhaibo ("Mother Ganges, I will offer you a yellow sari"), which was directed by Kundan Kumar.
1963's Lagi nahin chute ram was the all-time hit Bhojpuri film, and had higher attendance than Mughal-e-Azam in the eastern and northern regions of India. Bollywood's Nadiya Ke Paar is another well-known Bhojpuri-language movie. Films such as Bidesiya ("Foreigner", 1963, directed by S. N. Tripathi) and Ganga ("Ganges", 1965, directed by Kundan Kumar) were profitable and popular, but in general Bhojpuri films were not commonly produced in the 1960s and 1970s.

In the 1980s, enough Bhojpuri films were produced to support a dedicated industry. Films such as Mai ("Mom", 1989, directed by Rajkumar Sharma) and Hamar Bhauji ("My Brother's Wife", 1983, directed by Kalpataru) had success at the box office. However, this trend faded during the 1990s.

In 2001, Bhojpuri films regained popularity with Saiyyan Hamar ("My Sweetheart", directed by Mohan Prasad), which raised actor Ravi Kishan to prominence. Several other commercially successful films followed, including Panditji Batai Na Biyah Kab Hoi ("Priest, tell me when I will marry", 2005, directed by Mohan Prasad) and Sasura Bada Paisa Wala ("My father-in-law, the rich guy", 2005). These films did much better business in Uttar Pradesh and Bihar than mainstream Bollywood hits at the time, and were both made on extremely tight budgets. Sasura Bada Paisa Wala also introduced Manoj Tiwari, formerly a well-loved folk singer, to the wider audiences of Bhojpuri cinema. The success of Ravi Kishan and Manoj Tiwari's films led to a revival in Bhojpuri cinema, and the industry began to support an awards show and trade magazine Bhojpuri City. The industry produces over one hundred films per year.
 
In 2019, Maithili film Mithila Makhaan won Best Maithili Film in the 63rd National Film Awards.

Mass media 

Biharbandhu was the first Hindi newspaper published in Bihar. It was started in 1872 by Madan Mohan Bhatta, a Marathi Brahman who settled in Bihar Sharif. Hindi journalism often failed until it became an official language in the state. Hindi was introduced in the law courts in Bihar in 1880.

Urdu journalism and poetry have a long history in Bihar, with many poets such as Shaad Azimabadi, Kaif Azimabadi, Kalim Ajiz and Bismil Azimabadi. Bihar publishes many Urdu dailies, such as Qomi Tanzim and Sahara, and the monthly Voice of Bihar.

The beginning of the 20th century was marked by a number of notable new publications. A monthly magazine named Bharat Ratna was started in Patna, in 1901. It was followed by Ksahtriya Hitaishi, Aryavarta from Dinapure, Udyoga, and Chaitanya Chandrika. Udyog was edited by Vijyaanand Tripathy, a famous poet of the time, and Chaitanya Chandrika by Krishna Chaitanya Goswami, a literary figure of that time. The literary activity was not confined to Patna alone but to other districts of Bihar.

Festivals 

Chhath Puja is the biggest and most popular festival in Bihar. The four-day-long holy Hindu festival includes intense celebration across the state. Chhath Puja are done in various cities, towns, and villages throughout Bihar. All Bihar involves itself in devotion to Chhath Puja. It is decked up in lighting decorations and thousands of colourful ghats are set up where effigies of the goddess Chhath Maiya and her brother God Surya are displayed and worshipped while sunset and sunrise. The people of each and every religion goes to the bank of any river or near by the pond or lake for giving arghya to the Sun. They carry Fruits and thekuaa along with them in Soop and Daura(a bowl like structure made up of bamboo) for the worship. Nowadays it's widely spread all over the world where Bihari community lives.

Durga Puja is also the biggest, most popular and widely celebrated festival in Bihar. The ten-day-long colourful Hindu festival includes intense celebration across the state. Pandals are erected in various cities, towns, and villages throughout Bihar. The cities of Bihar transforms Durga Puja. It is decked up in lighting decorations and thousands of colourful pandals are set up where effigies of the goddess Durga and her four children are displayed and worshipped. The idols of the goddess are brought in from Kumortuli, where idol-makers work throughout the year fashioning clay models of the goddess. Since independence in 1947, Durga Puja has slowly changed into more of a glamorous carnival than a religious festival. Today people of diverse religious and ethnic backgrounds partake in the festivities. On Vijayadashami, the last day of the festival, the effigies are paraded through the streets with riotous pageantry before being immersed into the rivers.

Tourism 

Bihar is visited by many tourists from around the world, In 2019, 33 million tourists visited Bihar, including more than 1 million foreign tourists. Bihar is home to two UNESCO World Heritage Sites, as well as many other ancient monuments. The Mahabodhi Temple (literally: "Great Awakening Temple"), a UNESCO World Heritage site, is an ancient Buddhist temple in Bodh Gaya, marking the location where the Buddha is said to have attained enlightenment. The Khuda Bakhsh Library, which has one of the world's largest collection of books, rare manuscripts and paintings is located in Patna. Bodh Gaya (in Gaya district) is about 96 km (60 mi) from Patna. Nalanda Mahavihara, a UNESCO World Heritage site, is among the oldest universities in the world, situated in Nalanda, Bihar. It comprises the archaeological remains of a monastic and scholastic institution dating from the third century BCE to the 13th century CE. It includes stupas, shrines, viharas (residential and educational buildings) and important art works in stucco, stone and metal. Nalanda stands out as the most ancient university of the Indian subcontinent. Archaeological Survey of India has recognized 72 monuments in Bihar as Monuments of National Importance. Furthermore, Archaeological Survey of India has recognized 30 additional monument as protected monuments in Bihar.

Bihar has many places for ecotourism, which includes Valmiki National Park is famous national park and tiger reserve. Vikramshila Dolphin Sanctuary is home of endangered Gangetic Dolphin. Bihar has many wildlife sanctuary such  Bhimbandh Wildlife Sanctuary, Gautam Buddha Wildlife Sanctuary, Kaimur Sanctuary, Udaypur Wildlife Sanctuary and Pant Wildlife Sanctuary. Bihar invites many species of migratory birds at bird sanctuary like  Kanwar Lake Bird Sanctuary and Nagi Dam Bird Sanctuary.

Many tourists visit Bihar because of religious significance of the Bihar. Hindu Goddess Sita, the consort of Lord Rama, is believed to have been born in Sitamarhi in the Mithila region of modern-day Bihar. Gautama Buddha attained Enlightenment at Bodh Gaya, a town located in the modern day district of Gaya in Bihar. Vasupujya, the 12th Jain Tirthankara was born in Champapuri, Bhagalpur. Mahavira, the 24th and last Tirthankara of Jainism, was born in Vaishali around the sixth century BC. Śrāddha ritual performed in Pitru Paksha period considered as fruitful in the holy city of Gaya, which is seen as a special place to perform the rite, and hosts a fair during the Pitri Paksha period.

Transport

Airways 

Bihar has a total of three operational airports as of 2020: Lok Nayak Jayaprakash Airport in Patna, Gaya Airport in Gaya, and Darbhanga Airport in Darbhanga. All three airports have scheduled flights to major cities around India. Gaya Airport is the only international airport in Bihar, having seasonal flights to countries like Thailand, Bhutan, and Myanmar.

Railways 
All major cities, districts and towns are well connected.

Expressways 
Gaya-Darbhanga Expressway (access controlled highway) will be Bihar's first expressway of length 189 km, expected to be completed by 2024.

State highways 

Bihar has state highways with total length of 4,006 km (2,489 mi)  and national highways with total length of 5,358 km (3,329 mi).

Metro transit 
Patna will be the first city in Bihar to have mass rapid transit system. Patna Metro with network of  length is under construction as of 2022.

Bus transit 
Bihar State Road Transport Corporation (BSRTC) runs interstate, intrastate, and international route buses. BSRTC has daily ridership of around 100,000. Its fleet includes non-electric and electric buses, AC and non-AC buses. Delhi, Ranchi, and Kathmandu in Nepal are some of the destinations served outside Bihar. Patliputra Inter-State Bus Terminal is a major bus transit hub in Bihar.

Inland Waterways 
National Waterways-1 runs along Ganges river. Gaighat in Patna has a permanent terminal of inland waterways for handling cargo vessels. The Ganges is navigable throughout the year, and was the principal river highway across the vast Indo-Gangetic Plain. Vessels capable of accommodating five hundred merchants were known to ply this river in the ancient period, when it served as a conduit for overseas trade. The role of the Ganges as a channel for trade was enhanced by its natural links to major rivers and streams in north and south Bihar.

Education 

Historically, Bihar has been a major centre of learning, home to the ancient universities of Nalanda (est. 450 CE), Odantapurā (est. 550 CE) and Vikramashila (est. 783 CE). Nalanda and Vikramshila universities were destroyed by Islamic invader Bakhtiyar Khilji in 1200 CE. Bihar saw a revival of its education system during the later part of the British rule, when Khuda Bakhsh Oriental Library was established in 1891 by Sir Khan Bahadur Khuda Bakhsh which is currently one of the world's largest functioning library and boast 5 Million items. It is known for its paintings and rare manuscripts. Patna University, the seventh oldest university of the Indian subcontinent, was established in 1917. Some other centres of high learning established under British rule are Patna College (est. 1839), Bihar School of Engineering (est. 1900; now known as National Institute of Technology, Patna), Prince of Wales Medical College (est. 1925; now Patna Medical College and Hospital), Science College, Patna (est. 1928), Patna Women's College, Bihar Veterinary College (est. 1927), and Imperial Agriculture Research Institute (est. 1905; now Dr. Rajendra Prasad Central Agriculture University, Pusa). The Patna University, one of the oldest universities in Bihar, was established in 1917, and is the seventh oldest university of the Indian subcontinent. Second oldest engineering college of India known as NIT Patna was established as survey training school in 1886 and later renamed as Bihar College of Engineering in 1932.

Today, Bihar is home of 8 Institutes of National Importance: IIT Patna, IIM Bodh Gaya, AIIMS, Patna, NIT Patna, IIIT Bhagalpur, NIPER Hajipur, Khuda bakhsh Oriental Library and Nalanda International University. In 2008, Indian Institutes of Technology Patna was inaugurated with students from all over India and same year National Institute of Fashion Technology Patna was established as the ninth such institute in India.  The Indian Institute of Management Bodh Gaya was established in 2015. In March 2019, the government of Bihar has sent a proposal to centre Government to upgrade Darbhanga Medical College and Hospital into an AIIMS-like institution. Bihar is home of four Central universities which includes Central University of South Bihar, Mahatma Gandhi Central University, Dr. Rajendra Prasad Central Agriculture University and Nalanda University. In 2015, the central government had proposed re-establishment of Vikramshila in Bhagalpur and had designated 500 crores (5 billion) for it.  Bihar also has the National Institute of Fashion Technology Patna, National Law University, Patna  Institute of Hotel Management (IHM), Footwear Design and Development Institute, Bihta and  Central Institute of Plastic Engineering & Technology (CIPET) Center.  CIPET and IHM was established in Hajipur in 1994 and 1998 respectively. Aryabhatta Knowledge University was established under Aryabhatta Knowledge University Act, 2008 of  Bihar Government with purpose of the development and management of educational infrastructure related to technical education, medical, management and allied professional education in Bihar. Based on 2020–21 data, Aryabhatta Knowledge University has 56 Engineering and Pharmacy colleges, 15 Medical colleges, 33 Educational colleges, 8 community colleges, 36 Nursing colleges and 11 Vocational colleges. Chanakya National Law University and Chandragupt Institute of Management were established in the later half of 2008 and  now attracts students from not just within Bihar but also students from far flung states. Nalanda International University is established in 2014 with active investment from countries such as Japan, Korea, and China.  The A.N. Sinha Institute of Social Studies is a premier research institute in the state. Bihar has eight medical colleges which are funded by the government, namely Patna Medical College and Hospital, Nalanda Medical College and Hospital, Vardhman Institute of Medical Sciences, Indira Gandhi Institute of Medical Sciences, Darbhanga Medical College and Hospital, Anugrah Narayan Magadh Medical College and Hospital Gaya, Sri Krishna Medical College and Hospital, Jawaharlal Nehru Medical College, Bhagalpur, Government Medical College, Bettiah and five private medical colleges

Bihta, a suburb of state capital Patna, is home of institutes like IIT Patna, AIIMS, Patna, BIT, Patna and is now emerging as an education hub. With institute like Super 30, Patna has emerged as a major center for engineering and civil services coaching. The major private IIT-JEE coaching institutes have opened up their branches in Bihar and this has reduced the number of students who go to, for example, Kota and Delhi for engineering/medical coaching.

Bihar e-Governance Services & Technologies (BeST) and the government of Bihar have initiated a unique program to establish a centre of excellence called Bihar Knowledge Center, a finishing school to equip students with the latest skills and customised short-term training programs at an affordable cost. The centre aims to attract the youth of the state to improve their technical, professional, and soft skills, to meet the current requirements of the industrial job market. The National Employability Report of Engineering Graduates, 2014, puts graduates from Bihar in the top 25 percent of the country, and rates Bihar as one of the three top states at producing engineering graduates in terms of quality and employability.

See also 
 Bihar Diwas
 Outline of Bihar
 Timeline of Bihar
 Bihari culture
 Cuisine of Bihar
 Chhotanagpur Front
 Chhotanagpur Plateau Praja Parishad
 List of people from Bihar

References

Further reading 

 Swami Sahajanand Saraswati Rachnawali (Selected works of Swami Sahajanand Saraswati), Prakashan Sansthan, Delhi, 2003.
 Christopher Alan Bayly, Rulers, Townsmen, and Bazaars: North Indian Society in the Age of British Expansion, 1770–1870, Cambridge University Press, 1983.
 Anand A. Yang, Bazaar India: Markets, Society, and the Colonial State in Bihar, University of California Press, 1999.
 Acharya Hazari Prasad Dwivedi Rachnawali, Rajkamal Prakashan, Delhi.
 Swami Sahajanand and the Peasants of Jharkhand: A View from 1941 translated and edited by Walter Hauser along with the unedited Hindi original (Manohar Publishers, paperback, 2005).
 Sahajanand on Agricultural Labour and the Rural Poor translated and edited by Walter Hauser (Manohar Publishers, paperback, 2005).
 Religion, Politics, and the Peasants: A Memoir of India's Freedom Movement translated and edited by Walter Hauser (Manohar Publishers, hardbound, 2003).
 Pandit Yadunandan (Jadunandan) Sharma, 1947, Bakasht Mahamari Aur Uska Achook Ilaaz (Bakasht Epidemic and its Infalliable Remedy) in Hindi, Allahabad.
 Jagannath Sarkar, "Many Streams" Selected Essays by Jagannath Sarkar and Reminiscing Sketches" Compiled by Gautam Sarkar Edited by Mitali Sarkar, First Published May 2010, Navakarnataka Publications Private Limited, Bangalore.
 Indradeep Sinha, 1969, Sathi ke Kisanon ka Aitihasic Sangharsha (Historic Struggle of Sathi Peasants), in Hindi, Patna.
 Indradeep Sinha, Real face of JP's total revolution, Communist Party of India (1974).
 Indradeep Sinha, Some features of current agrarian situation in India, All India Kisan Sabha, (1987).
 Indradeep Sinha, The changing agrarian scene: Problems and tasks, Peoples Publishing House (1980).
 Indradeep Sinha, Some questions concerning Marxism and the peasantry, Communist Party of India (1982).
 
 Nand Kishore Shukla, The Trial of Baikunth Sukul: A Revolutionary Patriot, Har-Anand, 1999, 403 pages, .
 Shramikon Ke Hitaishi Neta, Itihas Purush: Basawon Singh published by the Bihar Hindi Granth Academy (1st Edition, April 2000).
 Ramchandra Prasad, Ashok Kumar Sinha, Sri Krishna Singh in Adhunik Bharat ke Nirmata Series, Publications Division, Ministry of Information and Broadcasting, Government of India.
 Walter Hauser, 1961, Peasant Organisation in India: A Case Study of the Bihar Kisan Sabha, 1929–1942, Ph.D. Thesis, University of Chicago, (Forthcoming publication).
 Rai, Algu, 1946, A Move for the Formation of an All-Indian Organisation for the Kisans, Azamgrah.
 N. G. Ranga, 1949, Revolutionary Peasants, New Delhi.
 N. G. Ranga, 1968, Fight For Freedom, New Delhi.
 Mahapandit Rahul Sankrityayan, 1943, Naye Bharet ke Naye Neta (New Leaders of New India), in Hindi, Allahabad.
 Mahapandit Rahul Sankrityayan, 1957, Dimagi Gulami (Mental Slavery), in Hindi, Allahabad.
 Manmath Nath Gupta, Apane samaya ka surya Dinkar, Alekha Prakasana (1981).
 Khagendra Thakur, Ramdhari Singh 'Dinkar': Vyaktitva aur Krititva, Publications Division, 2008 Ministry of Information and Broadcasting, Government of India.
 Vijendra Narayan Singh, Bharatiya Sahitya ke Nirmata: Ramdhari Singh 'Dinkar, Sahitya Akademi, New Delhi, 2005, .
 Kumar Vimal, Ramdhari Singh Dinkar Rachna – Sanchayan, Sahitya Akademi, New Delhi, 2008, .
 Mishra Shree Govind, History Of Bihar 1740–1772, Munshiram Manoharlal, 1970
 Verma B S, Socio-religious Economic And Literary Condition Of Bihar (From ca. 319 A.D. to 1000 A.D.), Munshiram Manoharlal, 1962
 Maitra A,Magahi Culture, Cosmo Publications, New Delhi, 1983
 Naipaul V S, India: A Wounded Civilization, Picador, 1977
 Trevithick Alan, The Revival Of Buddhist Pilgrimage At Bodh Gaya (1811–1949): Anagarika Dharmapala And The Mahabodhi Temple
 Jannuzi F. Tomasson,  Agrarian Crisis In India: The Case Of Bihar, University of Texas Press, 1974, 
 Omalley L S S, History of Magadh, Veena Publication, 2005, 
 Shukla Prabhat Kumar, Indigo And The Raj: Peasant Protests In Bihar 1780–1917, Pragati Publications, 1993, 
 Ahmad Qeyamuddin, Patna Through The Ages: Glimpses of History, Society & Economy, Commonwealth Publishers, 1988
 Jain B D, Ardha Magadhi Reader, Sri Satguru Publications, Lahore, 1923
 Patra C, Life in Ancient India: As Depicted In The Digha Nikaya, Punthi Pustak, 1996, 
 Hazra Kanai Lal, Buddhism in India As Described by the Chinese Pilgrims AD 399–689, Munshiram Manoharlal, 1983, 
 McCrindle John W., Ancient India As Described By Megasthenes And Arrian, Munshiram Manoharlal
 McCrindle John W., Ancient India As Described By Ptolemy, Munshiram Manoharlal, 1927, 
 Sastry Harprasad, Magadhan Literature, Sri Satguru Publications, Calcutta, 1923
 Rai Alok, Hindi Nationalism, Orient Longman, 2000, 
 Waddell Austine L., Report on the Excavations at Pataliputra (Patna) – The Palibothra of the Greeks, Asian Publicational Services, Calcutta, 1903
 Das Arvind N., The State of Bihar: an economic history without footnotes, Amsterdam: VU University Press, 1992
 Brass Paul R., The politics of India since Independence, Cambridge University Press, 1990
 Askari S. H., Mediaeval Bihar: Sultante and Mughal Period, Khuda Bakhsh Oriental Public Library, Patna, 1990
 Tayler William, Three Months at Patna during the Insurrection of 1857, Khuda Bakhsh Oriental Public Library, Patna, 2007
 Taylor P.J.O., "What really happened during the Mutiny: A day by day account of the major events of 1857–1859 in India", Oxford University Press, 1997, 
 Pathak Prabhu Nath, Society and Culture in Early Bihar (C.A.D. 200 – 600), Commonwealth Publishers, 1988
 Basham A. L., The Wonder that was India, Picador, 1954, 
 Nambisan Vijay, Bihar in the eye of the beholder, Penguin Books, 2000, 
 Pathak Mohan, Flood plains and Agricultural occupance, Deep & Deep Publication, 1991, 
 D'Souza Rohan, Drowned and Dammed:Colonial Capitalism and Flood Control in Eastern India, Oxford University Press, 2006,
 Radhakanta Barik – Land & Caste Politics in Bihar (Shipra Publications, Delhi, 2006)

External links 

 Government
 Official site of Bihar 
 Bihar State Tourism Development Corporation

 General information
  
    
 
  
 

 
1912 establishments in India
Hindi-speaking countries and territories
States and territories established in 1912
States and union territories of India
Urdu-speaking countries and territories